The 1969–70 season of the European Cup Winners' Cup football club tournament was won by Manchester City in a final victory against Górnik Zabrze.

Preliminary round

|}

First round

|}

First leg

Second leg

Rangers won 2–0 on aggregate.

Second round

|}

Quarter-finals

|}

Semi-finals

|}

First leg

Second leg

3–3 on aggregate.

Manchester City won 5–2 on aggregate.

Play-off

Górnik Zabrze won on a coin toss.

Final

See also
 1969–70 European Cup
 1969–70 Inter-Cities Fairs Cup

External links
 1969-70 competition at UEFA website
 Cup Winners' Cup results at Rec.Sport.Soccer Statistics Foundation
 Cup Winners Cup Seasons 1969-70–results, protocols
 website Football Archive 1969–70 Cup Winners Cup

3
UEFA Cup Winners' Cup seasons